Alexander Brown may refer to:

Sports
Alexander Brown (cricketer) (born 1967), English cricketer
Sandy Brown (footballer, born 1877) (Alexander Brown, 1877–1944), Scottish footballer 
Sandy Brown (footballer, born 1939) (Alexander Dewar Brown, 1939–2014), Scottish footballer

Music
Alexander Brown (director) (born 1985), English music video director and designer
Alexander Brown (musician) (born 1982), Danish DJ, part of Morten Hampenberg & Alexander Brown

Politics
Sir Alexander Brown, 1st Baronet (1844–1922), British Member of Parliament who is remembered for many decades of service
Alexander Brown (Australian politician) (1851–1926), Australian member of New South Wales Legislative Assembly/Legislative Council
Alexander Laing Brown (1851–1936), British Member of Parliament for Hawick Burghs, 1886–1892
Alexander Garnet Brown (1930–2010), Canadian businessman and politician in the Nova Scotia House of Assembly

Sciences
Alexander Brown (engineer) (1830–1913), New Zealand marine engineer, foundry and shipping company manager
Alexander Brown (mathematician) (1878–1947), Scottish mathematician who became an academic in South Africa
Alexander Crum Brown (1838–1922), Scottish organic chemist remembered for his pioneering work in diagramming chemical compounds
Alexander T. Brown (1854–1929), inventor, engineer, businessman and entrepreneur in Syracuse, New York; see C. E. Lipe Machine Shop

Others
Alexander Blaine Brown (1808–1853), president of Jefferson College from 1847 to 1856
Alexander Brown (author) (1843–1906), American writer who specialized in historical studies of colonial Virginia
Alexander Kellock Brown (1849–1922), Scottish painter

See also
Alex Brown (disambiguation)
Alex Browne (disambiguation)
Alexander Browne (disambiguation)
Brown (surname)